Clinton Thomas Dent FRCS (7 December 1850 –  26 August 1912) was an English surgeon, author and mountaineer.

Early life
The fourth surviving son of Thomas Dent, he was educated at Eton College and Trinity College, Cambridge.

Alpinism
Alongside Albert Mummery, Dent was one of the most prominent of the British climbers who attempted the few remaining unclimbed mountains in the Alps in the period known as the silver age of alpinism. As an alpinist, Dent was very different from Mummery:

Dent's first ascents in the Alps include the Lenzspitze (4,294 m) in the Pennine Alps in August 1870, with Alexander Burgener and a porter, Franz Burgener (of whom Dent wrote 'his conversational powers were limited by an odd practice of carrying heavy parcels in his mouth'), and the Portjengrat (Pizzo d'Andollo, 3,654 m) above the valley of Saas-Fee in 1871. On 5 September 1872 the combined parties of Dent and guide Alexander Burgener, with George Augustus Passingham, and his guides Ferdinand Imseng and Franz Andermatten, made the first ascent of the south-east ridge of the Zinalrothorn (4,221 m); this is the current voie normale on the mountain.

He then turned his attention to the Aiguille du Dru (3,754 m), a steep granite peak in the Mont Blanc massif that had been ignored by the early generation of alpinists whose ambitions had been focused more on the higher mountains. After eighteen failed attempts with a number of different guides and companions (during which he used ladders to overcome difficulties), Dent at last made the first ascent of the Grande Aiguille du Dru (the higher of the mountain's two summits) on 12 September 1878, with  James Walker Hartley and the guides Alexander Burgener and Kaspar Maurer. He wrote of the Dru:

Together with British alpinists such as Mummery, A. W. Moore and D. W. Freshfield, Dent was involved in the pioneering of climbing in the Caucasus, where he made the first ascent of Gestola (4,860 m) with W. F. Donkin in 1886. Writing in the Alpine Journal a year later, Dent strongly encouraged the members of the Alpine Club (of which he was President from 1886 to 1889) to travel to the region:

Dent may have been the first person to have written – in his book Above the Snow Line (1885) – that an ascent of Mount Everest was possible. According to Geoffrey Winthrop Young, 'He has often been quoted as saying that the Alps were exhausted as far back as the 1880s, and he once wrote me a friendly warning not to attempt new Alpine ways, "since there is really nothing left worth risking much for"'. He also took part in the establishment of the Alpine distress signal in 1894.

In Who's Who 1912, Dent gave his recreations as "mountaineering and travel, or any form of hard exercise; art collecting; photography".

Medical career
Dent was a well-known Senior Surgeon at the St George's Hospital medical school, London, Consulting Surgeon at the Belgrave Hospital for Children, Chief Surgeon to the Metropolitan Police from 1904, and a Fellow of the Royal College of Surgeons. The University of Cambridge awarded him the honorary degree of MCh. He wrote extensively, and his publications include studies of post-surgical insanity and heart surgery, and an account of the wounded in the Transvaal War, to which he had been posted as a correspondent for the British Medical Journal. He also had a special interest in dermatology.

Death
Dent died at the age of 61 after a 'mysterious attack of blood poisoning' and is buried at Kensal Green Cemetery. There is a memorial tablet to him on the Britannia Hut above Saas-Fee.

Publications
Dent, Clinton Thomas, 'The Ascent of Gestola', in On the Edge of Europe: Mountaineering in the Caucasus, ed. Audrey Salkeld, Mountaineers Books, 1994, 
Dent, Clinton Thomas, Above The Snow Line: Mountaineering Sketches Between 1870 And 1880, Kessinger Publishing, 2007, 
Dent, Clinton Thomas, Mountaineering, London: Longmans, Green, 1892. 2nd edition (pp. xx + 439, with 2 pages of advertisements, 13 plates and illustrations in text by H. G. Willink and others, with contributions by W. M. Conway, D. W. Freshfield, C. E. Mathews, C. Pilkington, F. Pollock). Republished by Kessinger Publishing, 2007, 
Dent, Clinton Thomas and Christian Albert Theodor Billroth, Clinical Surgery. Extracts from the reports of surgical practice between the years 1860–1876, translated and edited, with annotations, by C. T. Dent and C. A. T. Billroth, New Sydenham Society, vol. 94

References

Bibliography
Dumler, Helmut and Burkhardt, Willi P. (1994) The High Mountains of the Alps. London: Diadem. 
Engel, Claire (1971) Mountaineering in the Alps, London: George Allen and Unwin

External links
 
 

1850 births
1912 deaths
Burials at Kensal Green Cemetery
Alumni of Trinity College, Cambridge
Chief Surgeons of the Metropolitan Police
English mountain climbers
British mountain climbers
19th-century English medical doctors
English surgeons
People educated at Eton College
Presidents of the Alpine Club (UK)
Fellows of the Royal College of Surgeons
20th-century English medical doctors
20th-century surgeons